This is a list of Kilkenny people including those who were born in County Kilkenny, in Ireland and have lived there for most of their lives. Also included on the list are people who were not born in County Kilkenny, but have lived there for most of their lives or are associated with County Kilkenny.

Art

Actors 
James O'Neill (1849–1920)

Architecture 
James Hoban (1762–1831)
William Robertson (1770-1850)

Artists 
Mildred Anne Butler (1858–1941)
Gerard Casey (born c.1960)
Edmund Garvey (1740–1813)

Painters 
Mildred Ann Butler (1858–1941)
Kathleen Marescaux (1868–1944)
Tony O'Malley (1913–2003)

Sculptor 
Christopher Hewetson (1739–1799)

Writing 

 Deborah Alcock (1825–1913), author
 John Banim (1798–1842), novelist
 Hubert Butler (1900–1991), essayist
 James Graves (1815–1886), antiquarian and author
 Constantia Grierson (1705–1732), editor, poet, and classical scholar
 Thomas Kilroy (born 1934), playwright and novelist
 John Locke (1847–1889), poet, writer and Fenian
 Dónall Mac Amhlaigh (1926–1989), writer
 Brian Mac Giolla Phádraig (c.1580–c.1652), scholar and poet
 Francis MacManus (1909–1965), novelist

 Gerardine Meaney, Irish feminist critic
 John O'Donovan (1806–1861), scholar
 Standish James O'Grady (1846–1928), author, journalist, and historian
 Katharine A. O'Keeffe O'Mahoney (1852–1918), educator, lecturer, writer
 Richard Lalor Sheil (1791–1851), politician, writer and orator

Music 
John Martyn (1948–2009)
Seamus Moore (born 1947)
George William Torrance (1835–1907)
Ronan Tynan (born 1960)
Robert Grace

Military 
John Barry (1873–1901), recipient of the Victoria Cross
Dan Bryan (1900–1985), Army officer
John Byrne (1832–1879), recipient of the Victoria Cross
William Dowling (1825–1887), recipient of the Victoria Cross
Frederick Hall (1885–1915), recipient of the Victoria Cross
Walter Hamilton (1856–1879), recipient of the Victoria Cross
Robert Johnston (1872–1950), recipient of the Victoria Cross
John Ryan (1823–1858), recipient of the Victoria Cross

Business 
Patrick Cudahy (1849–1919), Meat Packer and philanthropist
James Butler (1855–1934), American Grocery Store and Racetrack owner
Sean O'Farrell (1909–1972), National Ploughing Association and National Ploughing Championships

Politicians 

Liam Aylward (born 1952)
Bobby Aylward
Edward Butler (1823–1879), Australian politician
James Butler, 1st Duke of Ormonde (1610–1688)
James Butler, 2nd Duke of Ormonde (1665–1745)
Piers Butler, 1st Earl of Ormonde (c.1467–1539)
Thomas Butler, Earl of Ossory (1634–1680)
Robert Cane (1807–1858)
Kieran Crotty
John Dunn, Jr. (1827–1909), American politician
Kathleen Funchion
Jim Gibbons (1924–1997), Irish politician, Minister of Agriculture
Phil Hogan (born c. 1965)
John McGuinness (born 1955)
Malcolm Noonan, former Mayor of Kilkenny and Minister of State for Heritage and Electoral Reform since 2020
Séamus Pattison
John Paul Phelan
Ann Phelan
James Stephens (1825–1901), Fenian
Margaret Tynan (1930–2007), first woman Mayor of Kilkenny

Judicial
Peter Smithwick (born 1937), President of the District Court of Ireland 1988-2005

Religious 
William Carrigan (1857–1924)
James J. Davis (1852–1926)
Michael Anthony Fleming (c.1792–1850)
Thomas Francis Hendricken (1827–1886)
John Ireland (1838–1918)
Edmund Ignatius Rice (1762–1844)

Science, education and technology 
Robert Barber (1749–1783)
George Berkeley (1685–1753)
Abraham Colles (1773–1843)
Peter Wyse Jackson (born c.1955)
Aoife Gowen

History 
John Bradley (historian) (1954-2014)
James Graves (antiquarian) (1815 – 1886)
Margaret Phelan (1902-2000), historian
John G. A. Prim (1821 – 1875), antiquarian

Sport 

D.J. Carey (born 1970)
Eddie Keher (born 1941)
Maeve Kyle (born 1928)
James Mason (1849–1905), Irish-born chess player
Sinead Delahunty-Evans, Olympic athlete
Paddy Mullins (1919–2010), Racehorse trainer
Sean Patrick Maguire (born 1993) Footballer
Michael Drennan (born 1994) Footballer

Hurling

Players

Managers
Brian Cody
Pat Henderson
Fr. Tommy Maher
Ollie Walsh

People who lived or were educated in Kilkenny
Robert Blackburn (educationalist), born in Kilkenny in 1927.
Michael Byrne (1761–?)
John Clyn (14th century)
William Congreve (1670–1729)
Joseph Fiennes
Ralph Fiennes
Henry Flood (1732–1791), Statesman and orator
Oisín Kelly (1915–1981)
Lionel of Antwerp, Duke of Clarence (1338–1368)
Theobald Mathew (1790–1856)
Séamus Pattison (born 1936)
Robert Clarke Shearman (1825–1910), New Zealand policeman and farmer, born in Kilkenny
Jonathan Swift (1667–1745)

People who died or are buried in Kilkenny
John Lavery (1856–1941)

Other people associated with Kilkenny
Max Adrian (1903-1973), actor, noted for Shakespearean roles and a favourite of Ken Russell
Anne Anderson, Irish ambassador to the United States
Lady Mary Butler (1689–1713)
Mabel Cahill, U.S. Open Tennis Champion
Senator Ellen Cuffe, Countess of Desart (1857–1933), philanthropist
Dame Alice Kyteler (1280–c.1325)
Saint Brendan (460–577)
Saint Canice (525–599)
Saint Fiachra (died 670)
Saint Finbarr (c.550–c.620)
Saint Kieran (350–400)
Thomas Nash, Irish fisherman, settled in Newfoundland and Labrador, Canada; founder of Branch, Newfoundland and Labrador

See also
Viscount Mountgarret
List of Irish people
The Riordans
Lists of people by nationality
List of Cork people
List of Donegal people
List of Dublin people
List of Galway people
List of Kilkenny people
List of Limerick people
List of Sligo people
List of Waterford people

References

External links
Kilkenny Genealogy – Surnames

People
Kilkenny